Malta Channel separates the European island of Malta from the southern tip of Sicily. The channel serves as a sea route link to Europe for the Maltese. Virtu Ferries and Ponte Ferries take people and cars from Malta to Italy and vice versa.

In World War II, this sea saw naval battles and was also heavily mined when the Crown Colony of Malta tried to supply the island. Also there were other naval battles fought between the Knights of Malta and the Ottoman Navy, and also during the Punic Wars.

Channels of the Mediterranean Sea
Geography of Sicily
Straits of Italy
International straits
Borders of Italy
Borders of Malta
Straits of Malta
Coasts of Malta